Gongora fulva is a species of orchid found from Panama to Colombia.

References

External links

fulva
Orchids of Colombia
Orchids of Panama